Barbeuia madagascariensis is a liana found only on the island of Madagascar.

Barbeuia has occasionally been placed in its own family, Barbeuiaceae. The APG II system of 2003, for instance, recognizes such a family and assigns it to the order Caryophyllales in the clade core eudicots, after Philippe Cuénoud sequenced a fragment of the matK gene (extracted from a seed deposited in the Kew herbarium) and showed that Barbeuia does not belong in Phytolaccaceae. This represents a change from the APG system, of 1998, which did not recognize Barbeuiaceae as a family, for lack of molecular data.

References

External links
 Barbeuiaceae in L. Watson and M.J. Dallwitz (1992 onwards). The families of flowering plants: descriptions, illustrations, identification, information retrieval. Version: 19 August 2013. https://web.archive.org/web/20070103200438/http://delta-intkey.com/

Endemic flora of Madagascar
Monotypic Caryophyllales genera
Caryophyllales